A list of Western films released in the 2020s.

TV shows of the 2020s
See: List of Western television series

References

2020
Western